Pineywoods Community Academy, also known by the abbreviation PCA, is a PreK–12th grade charter school district located in Lufkin, Texas.

Curriculum
Pineywoods is a Pre-K through twelfth grade charter school. Students in Angelina County, Texas and surrounding areas are open for enrollment. The student teacher ratio is 1 teacher per 15.86 students, and the graduation rate is 100%.

Starting in the 2020–2021 school year students will only attend 4 days per week

Overall, Pineywoods was rated "A" by the Texas Education Agency.

Academics
High school students are able to take dual-credit courses available through Angelina College. Students are issued their own laptop that can be used at school as well as at home. The ECHS program allows for students to earn up to 60 college hours towards an associate degree. Pineywoods states that their curriculum goes beyond state-mandated TEKS.

Athletics
Athletic programs offered by the school include:
Swim & Dive
High School Boys Basketball
High School Girls Basketball
Middle School Boys Basketball
Middle School Girls Basketball

History
Pineywoods Community Academy opened in 1998.

Merilyn Sessions-Netherly the principal for Pineywoods ECHS program was arrested was charged with theft. Sessions-Netherly was stealing college text books from the school and selling them to students at Angelina College. She resigned in June 2019.

In November 2019, three students, inspired by the Columbine massacre, were arrested for plotting via text message to commit a shooting on the campus.

Revenue
Pineywoods obtains $9,332,000 annually of which $531,000 is from the federal government, $475,000 from local government, and $8,326,000 is from the state government.

Staff and student body

Student body
There is a total of 1,020 students enrolled in the school in the 2017–2018 school year. The student body of Pineywoods is  54.1% White, 25.6% Hispanic, 16.4% African American, 1.4% Asian, 0.1% Pacific Islander, and 2.5% two or more races. 50.7% of students are economically disadvantaged and 49.3% are non-educationally disadvantaged. Of the 82 students with disabilities 50 or 61% have an intellectual disability, 18 or 22% have a physical disability, 7 or 8.5% have autism, and 7 or 8.5% have a behavioral disability.

Staff
Teachers at Pineywoods make $48,574, which is lower than the state of Texas average. The school director is Dr. Ken Vaughn and the principal is Lacey Coleman.

School board
Members of the school board include:
J. Neal Naranjo, PhD (President)
Linda Robbins (vice-president)
Charlie E. Grumbles (Secretary)
Louise LaVane (Treasurer)
Joe Douglas, III
Dr. Josefa Santiago, M.D.
Sarah Strinden, PhD (Member Emeritus)

References

External links

Schools in Angelina County, Texas
Lufkin, Texas
Educational institutions established in 1998
1998 establishments in Texas